The Diocese of Monte Cassino (Latin: Dioecesis Cassinensis) was a Roman Catholic diocese located in Monte Cassino, a rocky hill on the former site of the Roman town of Casinum about  southeast of Rome, Italy,  to the west of the town of Cassino. In 1367, it was suppressed.

Ordinaries
Angelo Acciaioli (bishop), O.P. (1355-1357 Died)

See also
Catholic Church in Italy

References

Former Roman Catholic dioceses in Italy